Dai people live in different townships such as Matupi, Paletwa, Mindat, Kanpalet.Awm Sawi Village is one of Dai villages in Matupi Township. Awm Sawi people can communicate to other Dai people who live in different township though they have challenges speaking in the same dialect. However, the terminology of basic needs are very much the same as other Dai tribe. It is for sure, the closeness of one language is dictated by geographical distance. The tone of Awm Sawi dialect seems to have every bit from other tribes. It seems to be harsh, straight and direct.. As a result, Awm Sawi people can learn and speak other language with minimal effort.

Location

Awm Sawi is the name of a village located in west of Matupi city, southern Chin State, Burma. It is a hilly place and very beautiful village. There are about 200 houses, with a population of approximately 350 people. Most house are built with wood and bamboo. It used to be called just Awm Sawi. Some people started to move to Theih Ceng late 1975 or early 1980. Since then it is called Awm Sawi (A) or Butlang and Awm Sawi (B) or Theih Ceng Matupi Township, Chin state, Burma Located on Latitude: 21°28'52.81"N longitude : 93°26'11.53"E  Villagers

Language
The majority of the people speak local dialect, Awm sawi language. The language is similar to all other tribes and Ngala local language. It is a mixed of everything. It is very easy to communicate with other Dai Tribes in Matupi Township, Mindat Township and Paletwa Township. Awm Sawi people are also one of the Dai Tribes (Burmese called Dai-Yindu).

The surrounding villages are to the east Kal Im/Kuep Na, to the west Tuisip, to the North Matupi Town (in local language Batu) and to the south Kawica.

People

The Awm Sawi people are descendants of Nawnca. Pu Nawnca had two sons; they were Awm Zoe/Yoe and Thang Koel. The descendants of Awm Zoe/Yoe currently live in Butlang, whereas the descendants of Thang Koel live in Theihceng. The name Awm Sawi is used both as the name of people and the name of the village. People who live in Butlang are called Awm Yoe Carhi (sons of Awm Yoe). In the same manner, those who live in Theihceng are called Thangkoel Carhi (sons of Thang Koel). When there is special occasion or big celebration, they say Nawnca pa (Son of Nawnca). Today there are many sub-clans who are the descendants of Pu Nawn that live in Awm Sawi Village. They live in various places in search of better life style. Many also live in abroad after in year 2000. Vide Clip of Butlang

Where did they land?
It was believed that Pu Nawn had started life in the area of Tuibaap. They also had lived around Bui area where it is possible to find archaeological evidence. However, no one had conducted thorough research on the place Pu Nawn possibly might have lived. It would be very difficult to trace back the exact physical locations and the true historical event that evolved during Nawn's life on earth. No one had written document about him.

In Awm Sawi dialect: "Ni tui ni Khaw ni cet taanah khaw chang laa nih pha rhi pil nam Awm Sawi (Families) ca rhi boek boek sa din ca laa ban taang kut nim tuk rhi nueng. Thlaang rhging khaw sak ah “Ni tui ni khaw, ni nuh dam Pah dam, ni puu ni pii, ni huui ni tai, ni Nu ni Pa, ni koe ni naun, ni zu ni ca ti ce a nam hlih kom uk ti. Bawi ah mang nah om, khawdaeng patan awmah koeh rhem rhem nah om nawn ca ce nawn ca ni. Nah taa ah om lii vengah na pui-nah peh bawm kawi veng ah,a chang laa ah nan mang koek timoe. Nang ngah am na bawm ah moe u ngah a bawm hluen. Ya oe..ka pui oe, nin luem naa ni tui ni khaw oe..ya oe. Ue tueh ah aw ni khaw ham la bi ni bi hluen?" ("Even though you are in the richest country in the World, Even though you earn a lot of money, Even though you are a rich person, Even though you are rewarded uncountable metals, Even though you are gorgeous in the host country, Your grandparents; Your venerable Parents; Your lovely brothers and sisters; They live in hands to mouth bottomlessly. They are very poor and hopeless in life. Ya oe..they are looking for you to come back to them again. They thought that they had lost their precious one, they are praying to the Lord that His every blessings be with you, ka ca oe .. Ya oe. Ya..oe.")

Ram dang la ak awm rhi
Malaysia 2012 -Pa khaw Mi, Pa Aung Ting, Pa Pang Tang, Pa Awm Zoe, Pa Lawm Kim, Pa Thang Phung, Pa Win Aung, Pa Ba Hoe, Pa Khan Thang, Pa Piter,  Pa Hah Thang, Pa Za Lian, Pa San Oo, Pa Kap Lian, Pa Pa Sum, Pa Kyaw Ting, Pa Lai Kung, Pa Ngou Nai, Pa Ram Ngai, Pa Pa Ceu, Pa Rhueh Lii, Pa Bawi Thang

Cadawng rhi Pa Sai, Pa Hum, Lian Za Thang, Pa Kim, Ngai Thang, Kip Thang, Kyaw Thang Lian, Pa Hrang, K.M Zung Ha, Tlung Puen, Thaak Kung, Than Aung, Laal Luio, Piter, Maung Myint, Lian Mawi, Nyi Nyi Lwin, Pi Aung, Kawl Uk, Lai Kung, Ro Sung, Song Thang

In United States of America -Awm Sawi 2012, Pa Phun Sang, Pa Khaw Uk, Pa Peng Thang ( Am Shwe Thang), Pa Ram Uk, Pa Thang Lung, Pa Bik Lian, Pa Kui Tam, Pa Ngai Uep, Pa Zawng Nuen, Pa Zawm Rgueh, Pa David, Pa Paya

Cadawng rhi, Za He, Tha Due, Mang Lian, Hun Tuem, Pa Thang, Thang Kawm, Mawn Thang

Australian -Awm Sawi Families 2013)- Pa Tui Moe, Pa Pai Ting, Pa Ni Thang, Pa Ba Hoe

Cadawng rhi la - Phillip, Htun Nai, Rem Thang

Canadian-Awm Sawi rhi laa- Pa Van Ngai, Htun Tuep,

Religion and Practices

The descendants of Nawn or Awm Sawi people practiced animism before the arrival of Christianity in 1952. They worshipped spirit (Khaw or Rgaai). When someone got sick, they brought burn offering to the Spirit (Khaw or Rgai). They believed that the spirit is responsible for bringing good fortunes as well as bad lucks. It was believed to make the right offering to the spirit, one of the expert among the elders had to see eggs (thlungtoek). By looking at the eggs, the spirit told or revealed what kind of offering should be made. For example, how many goats, pigs, cows should be slaughter so that the spirit would be content with the offering. This is one of the reason people live in poverty.

Although Baptist Missionary had come to Matupi in 1948, Rev. Tha Dun, the first Baptist Missionary to Matupi, seemed not to start his missionary work in Awm Sawi. However, Pu. Sawng Bawi, one of the villagers who was a police officer in Falam Town, Northern Chin State, Burma brought Christianity to his own people. In 1952, Pu. Sawng Bawi left his job as a police officer and started his missionary work to his own people. This is the beginning of Christianity in Awm Sawi people and the surrounding villages. The last convert to Christianity from Animism was Pu Thang Tawm, in 1992. Awm Sawi people could celebrate Golden Jubilee of Pu. Sawng Bawi in 2002 to honor who introduced Christianity to its people and for his service the Lord.

Matu Association of Baptist Church Youth Conference in Awm Sawi

Denominations
There are many Churches: Baptist Church, Presbyterian Church, Assembly of God, and Roman Catholic Mission. Among those churches Baptist denomination has the largest church members and the second largest is Presbyterian church. There are more than 15 ministers serving the Lord. Most of the ministers are working in various mission fields in mainland Burma.

Education
Education is an important part of every culture and society. Despite the celebration of Golden Jubilee of the arrival of Christianity, the focus on education is still weak. There are two government sponsored elementary schools and one middle school which is privately run by villagers so that children do not have to travel 18 miles to Matupi to get high school education. Although middle school has been funded and run for over 20 years, the school do not receive any assistance from the government. Children aged 10 to 15 have a hard time getting a good education because their parents cannot afford to send their children to cities for study without accompanied by adults. This is one of the reason the people from this village are behind in terms of education. Even though there should have been many university graduates, only very few have gotten university degree.

Agriculture and Business
The people in this village do not have conventional business. Everyone works at his or her own farm. The main food source comes from farming. They do not buy at store like in the city. They practice shifting cultivation system. They do not do farm at one location. Year after year, they migrate in order to get good nutrient soil so that the crop can produce more crops. The main crops are rice and corn.

"Do you eat?" 
"Buh na ai hawh aw."

"Where do you go?" 
"Hala na ceh."

"Have a nice dream." 
"."

Populated places in Chin State